The battle took place on 28 March 1737 between the Marathas and the Mughal Empire at Talkatora near Delhi.

Background 
On 12 November 1736, the Maratha general Bajirao advanced on Old Delhi to attack the Mughal capital. Shaheer emperor Muhammad Shah sent Saadat Ali Khan I with a 150,000-strong army to stop the Maratha advance on Delhi. But Bajirao's subordinate chiefs Malhar Rao Holkar and Pilaji Jadhav crossed the river Yamuna and looted Ganga-Yamuna Doab, Saadat Khan defeated the maratha forces under Malhar Rao and retired to Mathura. Bajirao's army advanced to Delhi and encamped near Talkatora.

Battle 
Muhammad Shah sent Mir Hasan Khan Koka with an army to intercept Bajirao. The Mughals led an attack on Maratha army but were repulsed with heavy losses.

Aftermath 
The battle signified the further expansion of the Maratha Empire towards the north. Muhammad Shah called upon the Nizam's and Nawab's armies to destroy the Maratha Army. The Nizam of Hyderabad and the Nawab of Bhopal left Hyderabad to protect the Mughal Empire from the invasion of the Marathas, but they were defeated decisively in the Battle of Bhopal (24 December 1737). The Marathas extracted large tributaries from the Mughals, and signed a treaty which ceded Malwa to the Marathas.

The Maratha plunder weakened the Mughal Empire, which got further weakened after successive invasions of Nadir Shah in 1739 and Ahmad Shah Abdali in the 1750s. The continuous attacks led the Marathas to wage another Battle of Delhi in 1757 against the Rohillas who were pushed out, which largely effaced the remaining central authority of the Mughal Empire.

See also 
 Battle of Delhi (1803)
 Battle of Karnal
 Battle of Delhi (1757)

References 

Delhi 1737
Delhi 1737
Delhi 1737
1737 in Asia
1737 in India
18th century in Delhi